The Perth Football League is an Australian rules football competition based in Perth, Western Australia. It is the largest Australian rules football competition in Western Australia.

History
The competition began in 1922 with five teams as the Mercantile Football Association (MFA). The MFA changed its name in 1924 to the Perth Districts Football Association and then, in 1929, to the Western Australian Amateur Football Association. It changed to Western Australian Amateur Football League (WAAFL) in 1971. In 2019, the league rebranded as the Perth Football League. University are the most successful club, with 20 A-grade premierships and 96 overall, as of the conclusion of the 2020 season. Greg Erskine (University) is the games record holder for the club, along with holding the record for most number of beers drunk at the AJ. In 2021 Wembley's Nick "Threeser" Jeffries took his talents to the threes providing him with a more sustainable opportunity for Friday beers.

Sunday Football League (SFL) clubs, mostly based in the southeastern corridor, were merged into the general ranks of the amateurs. This was unfortunate as previously derbies between neighbouring clubs were an important and popular feature of the now defunct SFL.

Member clubs

A Grade premiers

Source: WAAFL.com.au

References

External links
Official WAAFL website
WAAFL at australianfootball.com

Australian rules football competitions in Western Australia
Sports leagues established in 1922
1922 establishments in Australia